Bačka is a village and municipality in the Trebišov District in the Košice Region of eastern Slovakia.

History
In historical records the village was first mentioned in 1214 as Bocskay family's property. It was recorded in 1214 as Becheka, in 1299 as Bachka, in 1323 Buchka, in as 1332 Bachka) Until 1918 and from 1939 to 1944 it belonged to Hungary.

Geography
The village lies at an altitude of 104 metres and covers an area of 9.578 km².
It has a population of about 600 people.

Ethnicity
The village is 100% Hungarian.

Facilities
The village has a public library

Genealogical resources

The records for genealogical research are available at the state archive "Statny Archiv in Kosice, Slovakia"

 Roman Catholic church records (births/marriages/deaths): 1719–1922
 Greek Catholic church records (births/marriages/deaths): 1795–1905
 Reformated church records (births/marriages/deaths): 1809–1929 (parish A)
 Census records 1869 of Backa are available at the state archive.

See also
 List of municipalities and towns in Slovakia

External links
https://web.archive.org/web/20070427022352/http://www.statistics.sk/mosmis/eng/run.html
Surnames of living people in Backa

Villages and municipalities in Trebišov District
Zemplín (region)